Padarn Halt was a passenger only railway station located in Llanberis, Gwynedd, Wales, on the western shore of Llyn Padarn. It opened on 21 November 1936 and closed on the outbreak of the Second World War. The line through the station remained in use for excursions until 1962 and for freight until 1964; it was lifted in 1965.

The LMSR closed the Llanberis branch to regular passenger services in 1930, though frequent Summer excursions continued to run. In 1934 the company reinstated a regular Saturdays only train specifically to serve Caernarfon market. In many parts of Britain "Market Trains" were an established part of local commerce and social life in a way which has passed into history. Llanberis station was not in the centre of Llanberis, so the company built the halt half a mile from the terminus specifically for this market traffic. The halt opened on 21 November 1936, from which time the market trains used the halt there instead of at Llanberis station. The halt consisted of an unlit single wooden platform on trestles, with a very small wooden waiting shelter at its southern end. It was accessed by a gravel footpath which continued over the tracks to the lakeside by a foot crossing.

The 1939 working timetable shows that some excursions made unadvertised stops at the halt.

No trace of the station remains.

References

Sources

External links
 The station on a navigable OS Map, via National Library of Scotland
 The station and line, via Rail Map Online
 The station and line CLS with mileages, via Railway Codes
 Images of the station, via Yahoo
 The station and line, via Rail Chronology
 The station and line, via Signalling Record Society
 1957 railtour including the line, via Manchester Railway Society
 5 May 1957 railtour record, via Six Bells Junction

Former London, Midland and Scottish Railway stations
Railway stations in Great Britain opened in 1936
Railway stations in Great Britain closed in 1939
Disused railway stations in Gwynedd
Llanberis